Thomas Masterson may refer to:
 Thomas Ambrose Masterson, American judge
 Thomas Masterson (American Revolution), officer in the American Revolution